Lewis Byington Ford (November 1, 1890 – January 19, 1985) was a Monterey Peninsula real estate developer. He was a major force in developing Pebble Beach and Carmel Woods. Ford established the Carmel Valley Airport, the first airpark of its kind in the United States, and developed a nearby business district. He created the Carmel Realty Company, was a cartoonist, poloist, baseball player, coach in the Carmel Abalone League, and acted in and directed over 45 plays. Ford was a major part of the social circle and society leader in the Monterey Peninsula. His ancestry dates back to the French Huguenots.

Early life

Byington Ford was born on November 1, 1890, in Downieville, Sierra County, California to Tirey L. Ford and Mary Emma Byington. His family moved to San Francisco in 1895. He experienced the 1906 San Francisco earthquake and fire when he was fifteen years old.

Ford graduated from Santa Clara College in 1910 with a Bachelor of Arts degree. At Santa Clara College, he acted in the Nazareth: The Passion Play of Santa Clara and was elected president of the debating team. He went on to get his masters from the University of California at Berkeley, graduating in 1913, where he earned his Master of Arts degree. The thesis for his master's degree was A History of the County Court of England from 1066-1307. Ford studied law at St. Ignatius Jesuit College, now the University of San Francisco, but gave up the idea of practicing law and instead went into the real estate.

On November 17, 1920, Ford married Marion Boisot in Pebble Beach, California, where he built their home on 17-Mile Drive two years later. He had three children: Mary Jane, Patricia and Audrey Ford.

On February 22, 1937, Ford married his second wife, Ruth Austin Mattimore, in Reno, Nevada.

Animated Film Corporation

In 1916, Ford was director of the Animated Film Corporation in San Francisco, of which his father, Tirey L. Ford, was president. The endeavor ended with the entry of the U.S. into World War I.

Military
In 1917, Ford enlisted in the California National Guard and went to Officers Training Camp at the Presidio of San Francisco where he was commissioned and then sent to France during World War I. He was captain in the 26th "Yankee" Division. In France, he trained at the Saint-Cyr cavalry school. He was in the engagements of Château-Thierry, Saint-Mihiel and the Toul sector. On March 10, 1919, Ford returned home after recuperating from a poison gas attack suffered during an advance in Troyon, France. Ford saw active service practically the whole time he was in France. He brought a detachment of soldiers to New York from France.

In 1941, Ford enlisted in the U.S. Army air force during World War II and became a lieutenant colonel.

Politics
While living in Carmel, Ford became involved in local politics. On August 25, 1934, speakers of the Carmel citizens' committee directly accused the John Reed Clubs of being a communistic organization. Ford, chairman of the committee, read reports from the national committees and showed charts seized in recently raided communist headquarters. Ford headed the citizens' committee to oppose the JRC and their activities.

Real estate
In 1919, working with Samuel Finley Brown Morse, Ford became manager at the Del Monte Properties in Pebble Beach, California, heading their real estate department for twelve years. He rode horseback through the undeveloped parts of Del Monte Forest to survey the land for development. In 1931 he formed the Carmel Realty Company.

Ford developed the first airpark in Carmel Valley. According to the Carmel Valley Historic Airport Society, "Convinced that mass production of small aircraft would put a plane within the reach of anyone who could afford a car, in the late 1930s Byington bought the northeast corner of Rancho Los Laureles for an airpark."

He and his brother Tirey Ford developed the Carmel Valley Airport for pilot-owners who would want to be at home a minute or two after getting out of their plane. A nearby road was named after him called Ford Road. Ford constructed the first two "hangar homes" when he opened the air park to the public on December 7, 1941; his timing proved unfortunate as this was the same day Pearl Harbor was bombed.

In 1954, Ford retired and Peter Delfino purchased the Carmel Valley Airport property for $35,000. In December 2020, Mary Delifno sold the Carmel Valley Airfield land to a local nursery owner, Griggs Nursery, with plans to use the area not for housing but to grow plants for retail sale.

In 1946, Byington and his brother, Tirey Ford, Jr., developed the Carmel Valley Village and Airway Market, first known as the General Store, which featured a barber shop, drug store, soda fountain, beauty shop and liquor store; all were in walking distance of the Airpark. Artist Bruce Ariss painted murals on each store to resemble a Spanish village.

Later life
In 1955, he wrote a sketch book called A Cartoon Sketch Book for Beginners.

Death

On January 19, 1985, at age 94, Ford died of pancreatic cancer at his home in Ventura, California.

Notes

References

External links

 Carmel Valley Vintage Airfield website

1890 births
1985 deaths
United States Army personnel of World War I
United States Army Air Forces personnel of World War II
American cartoonists
United States Military Academy alumni
People from Downieville, California
People from Carmel-by-the-Sea, California
Aviators from New York (state)
Military personnel from California